The 1949 Soviet football championship was the 17th seasons of competitive football in the Soviet Union and the 11th among teams of sports societies and factories. Dynamo Moscow won the championship becoming the Soviet domestic champions for the fifth time and ending the three-year run for the Army team.

Honours

Notes = Number in parentheses is the times that club has won that honour. * indicates new record for competition

Soviet Union football championship

First Group

Second Group

Subgroup Center (union republics)

Notes: 
 DO Riga was called Dinamo Riga

Subgroup Russia I

Subgroup Russia II

Notes:
 Metrostroi was called Metro Moskva
 SKIF is an abbreviation for Sports Club of Physical Culture Institute (Sportivnyi Klub Instituta Fizkultury)
 VVS is the club of Stalin's son Vasily Stalin.

Subgroup Russia II

Notes:
 UralMash was called Avangard Sverdlovsk
 Bolshevik was called Krylia Sovetov Omsk
 Shakhtyor was called Gornyak Kemerovo

Subgroup Russia III

Notes:
 Izhevskiy Zavod was called Zenit Izhevsk

Subgroup Russia IV

Notes:
 Kovrov city team was called Zenit Kovrov

Subgroup Ukraine
Despite promotion of Shakhtar Stalino and Lokomotyv Kharkiv, the Ukrainian zone was expanded further from 16 to 18 teams. Also the Ukrainian zone was left without Dinamo Kishenev that was relocated to the Central zone. There were no promotions from the 1948 Football Championship of the Ukrainian SSR, instead to the zone were admitted following teams: Spartak Kyiv, Torpedo Kharkiv, Dynamo Chernivtsi, Trudovye Rezervy Voroshylovhrad and DO Lviv. Dynamo Chernivtsi was the only team from the 1948 Ukrainian championship placing 8th out 9 teams in group 10.

Notes:
 Metallurg was called Stal Dnepropetrovsk

Tier final

Additional final playoff

Top goalscorers

1st Group
Nikita Simonyan (Spartak Moscow) – 26 goals

References

External links
 1949 Soviet football championship. RSSSF